Last Days in Vietnam is a 2014 American documentary film written, produced and directed by Rory Kennedy. The film had its world premiere at 2014 Sundance Film Festival on January 17, 2014.

After its premiere at Sundance Film Festival, American Experience Films acquired the distribution rights of the film, in association with PBS Distribution for DVD releases. The film had a theatrical release in New York City on September 5, 2014 before expanding nationwide in the United States during September and early October. The film was nominated for the Academy Award for Best Documentary Feature at the 87th Academy Awards. It also garnered a nomination for Best Documentary Screenplay from the Writers Guild of America. It premiered on PBS television on April 28, 2015.

Synopsis
During the chaotic final weeks of the Vietnam War, the North Vietnamese Army closes in on Saigon as the panicked South Vietnamese people desperately attempt to escape. On the ground, American soldiers and diplomats confront the same moral quandary: whether to obey White House orders to evacuate U.S. citizens only—or to risk punishment and save the lives of as many South Vietnamese citizens as they can. The events recounted in the film mainly center on the US evacuation of Saigon codenamed Operation Frequent Wind.

Interviewees included Henry Kissinger, Richard Armitage, Frank Snepp, Stuart Herrington, and Terry McNamara among numerous others.

Reception
Last Days in Vietnam received positive reviews from critics. Last Days in Vietnam  has an approval rating of 95% on review aggregator website Rotten Tomatoes, based on 62 reviews, and an average rating of 8.40/10. The website's critical consensus states, "As gripping as it is inspiring, Last Days in Vietnam offers a surprisingly fresh -- and heart-wrenching -- perspective on the end of the Vietnam War". It also has a score of 86 out of 100 on Metacritic, based on 33 critics, indicating "universal acclaim".

Rob Nelson of Variety, said in his review, "Rory Kennedy's documentary combines astonishing footage from Saigon in April 1975 with contemporary recollections from some who were there." Justin Lowe in his review for The Hollywood Reporter praised the film by saying, "A virtually untold chapter of American history still poignantly resonates nearly four decades later." Mary Sollosi of Indiewire, grade the film B+ and said, "While the documentary hardly breaks any new creative ground, its powerful content speaks for itself by revealing a harrowing episode of the Vietnam War — already a troubling chapter of American history." Dan Schindel in his review for Non-fics said, "'Last Days in Vietnam' was an incredibly pleasant surprise. It is a prime example of how documentaries can illuminate our shared memory’s gaps, and how nonfiction can frequently outdo the best thrills Hollywood has to offer."

References

External links
 Last Days In Vietnam Official website
 Last Days In Vietnam website on PBS.org
 
 
C-SPAN Q&A interview with Rory Kennedy about Last Days in Vietnam, October 26, 2014

2014 films
American Experience
Documentary films about the Vietnam War
2014 documentary films
American documentary films
Films set in Saigon
2010s American films